The Guernsey Open was a women's professional golf tournament on the Ladies European Tour. It was played from 1982 to 1984 and from 1987 to 1988.

Winners

Source:

References

External links
Ladies European Tour

Former Ladies European Tour events
Golf in Guernsey
Recurring sporting events established in 1982
Recurring sporting events disestablished in 1988